Balajub or Bala Jub may refer to:
 Balajub, Hamadan
 Balajub, Kermanshah